Kerry Williams (born June 15, 1973) is an American voice actress who has worked with 4Kids Entertainment, Central Park Media, TAJ Productions and DuArt Film and Video. She grew up in the Tidewater area of Virginia and has worked in Florida, Japan, and California as a dancer prior to pursuing a voice acting career in New York City.

Voice credits
 Fighting Foodons - Ham Scam-Witch
 Jungle Emperor Leo - Lukio
 Kirby: Right Back at Ya! - Tiff
 Magical DoReMi - Josie Huffington, Reanne's Mother
 Now and Then, Here and There - Soon
 One Piece - Nami (4Kids dub)
 Pokémon - Casey, Sakura, Macy, Janina, Maizie, Mary, Cherry, Peggy, Temacu, Mika, Katharine
 Pokémon: The First Movie (The Uncut Story of Mewtwo's Origin) - Amber
 Pokémon 4Ever - Towa (young)
 Pokémon: Jirachi—Wish Maker - Jirachi
 Pokémon: Mewtwo Returns - Domino
 Revolutionary Girl Utena - Kanae Ohtori, Shadow Girl C (eps 25-39), Yuko Ohse, Additional Voices
 Seven of Seven - Morinuma
 Shaman King - Ellie
 Shaman King: Power of Spirit - Meril Inugami
 Shrine of the Morning Mist - Yukie Uranami
 Sonic X - Frances
 Tama and Friends - Momo
 Ultimate Muscle - Kiki
 Winx Club - Amore, Flora (4Kids dub)
 Yu-Gi-Oh! Duel Monsters - Rebecca Hawkins

References

External links
 
 

American voice actresses
Living people
Place of birth missing (living people)
1973 births
21st-century American women